Kyungon may refer to any one of several places in Burma (Myanmar):

Ayeyarwady Region
 Kyungon, Danubyu in Danubyu Township
 Kyungôn in Pathein Township
 Kyungon, Wakema in  Wakema Township

Bago Region

 Kyungon, Bago Township in Bago Township
 Kyungon, Daik-U in Daik-U Township
 Kyungon, Gyobingauk in Gyobingauk Township
 Kyungon, Nyaunglebin in Nyaunglebin Township
 Kyungon (18°28'0"N 96°35'0"E) in Pyu Township
 Kyungon (18°18'0"N 96°32'0"E) in Pyu Township
 Kyungon, Shwegyin in Shwegyin Township
 Kyungon, Taungoo in Taungoo Township
 Kyungon, Tharrawaddy in Tharrawaddy Township
 Onhnèye also known as Kyungon in Kyauktaga Township

Kachin State
 Kyungon, Kachin in Mohnyin Township

Sagaing Region
 Kyungon, Banmauk in Banmauk Township
 Kyungon, Kanbalu in Kanbalu Township
 Kyungon, Wuntho in Wuntho Township

Yangon Region
 Kyungon, Yangon in Hlegu Township